The 2019 Basque foral elections were held on Sunday, 26 May 2019, to elect the 11th Juntas Generales of Álava, Biscay and Gipuzkoa. All 153 seats in the three Juntas Generales were up for election. The elections were held simultaneously with regional elections in twelve autonomous communities and local elections all throughout Spain, as well as the 2019 European Parliament election.

Opinion polls

Overall

Foral deputation control
The following table lists party control in the foral deputations. Gains for a party are displayed with the cell's background shaded in that party's colour.

Historical territories

Álava

Biscay

Gipuzkoa

References
Opinion poll sources

Other

Basque
2019